Deinopis, also known as net-casting spiders, gladiator spiders and ogre-faced spiders, is a genus of net-casting spiders that was first described by W. S. MacLeay in 1839. Its distribution is widely tropical and subtropical. They catch their prey using a specially spun "net". The name is derived from the Greek  (deinos), meaning "fearful", and opis, meaning "appearance", referring to their ogre-like faces. The spelling "Dinopis" is also found, but is regarded as an "unjustified emendation".

Net-casting
Spiders in the genus Deinopis catch their prey in an unusual fashion. They first spin a small upright rectangular cribellate web. This is then detached from its supporting threads and held horizontally above the ground by the spider's long front two pairs of legs while the spider hangs almost vertically. Passing prey is then captured by dropping the "net" over it.

Eyes
The two posterior median eyes are enlarged and forward-facing. These eyes have a wide field of view and are able to gather available light more efficiently than the eyes of cats and owls, and are 2000 times more sensitive to light than human photoreceptors. This is despite the fact that they lack a reflective layer (tapetum lucidum); instead, each night, a large area of light-sensitive membrane is manufactured within the eyes, and destroyed at dawn, with the membrane being converted into vesicles which are then lysed in the inter-rhabdoneral cytoplasm. To aid further in netting prey, the spider places white fecal spots on the surface below the net and uses them for aiming. Spiders also lack ears, but Deinopis use hairs and receptors (slit_sensillae) on their legs to distinguish sounds at a distance of up to 2 meters.

Species
 it contains twenty species:
D. amica Schiapelli & Gerschman, 1957 – Argentina, Uruguay
D. armaticeps Mello-Leitão, 1925 – Brazil
D. biaculeata Simon, 1906 – Brazil
D. bituberculata Franganillo, 1930 – Cuba
D. bucculenta Schenkel, 1953 – Venezuela
D. cylindracea C. L. Koch, 1846 – Colombia
D. diabolica Kraus, 1956 – El Salvador
D. fastigata Simon, 1906 – Brazil
D. granadensis Keyserling, 1879 – Colombia
D. guasca Mello-Leitão, 1943 – Brazil
D. guianensis Taczanowski, 1874 – French Guiana
D. lamia MacLeay, 1839 (type) – Cuba, Puerto Rico
D. longipes F. O. Pickard-Cambridge, 1902 – Mexico to Panama
D. pallida Mello-Leitão, 1939 – Brazil
D. pardalis Simon, 1906 – Brazil
D. plurituberculata Mello-Leitão, 1925 – Brazil
D. rodophthalma Mello-Leitão, 1939 – Brazil
D. seriata Simon, 1906 – Brazil
D. spinosa Marx, 1889 – USA, St. Vincent, Venezuela
D. tuboculata Franganillo, 1926 – Cuba

References

External links
Deinopis at BugGuide

 Video of Gladiator spider constructing the net and catching its prey
 Picture of Deinopis ravida

Araneomorphae genera
Deinopidae